The National Social Security Fund (NSSF) is a quasi-government agency responsible for the collection, safekeeping, responsible investment, and distribution of retirement funds from employees of the private sector in Uganda who are not covered by the Government Retirement Scheme. Participation for both employers and employees is compulsory. The Uganda National Social Security Fund is the largest pension fund in the countries of the East African Community, with assets of USh15.5 trillion (approx. US$4.406 billion), as of June 2021.

History
In February 2009, the President of Uganda fired the minister of finance, whose ministry supervises the activities of NSSF. Also terminated were the managing director of the NSSF. A new board of directors and a new management team were appointed in 2009.

In late 2010, NSSF underwent a restructuring process aimed at making it more efficient, competitive, and responsive to the needs of its members. It was then poised to provide a wide range of social security products and be the lead institution for domestic capital formation and deepening the financial sector. Analysts in the country said in 2013 that the NSSF had become a leading player in the country's economy.

Investment portfolio
In July 2018, the fund's investments included (a) fixed income investments, accounting for 77 percent of all investments (b) equities on the security exchanges of the East African countries, accounting for 17 percent and (c) real estate investments, which are 6 percent of the total portfolio.

Significant real estate holdings include Workers' House in the centre of Kampala, Uganda's capital city, where NSSF maintains its head office, and City House Jinja, in Jinja, developed between 2015 and 2018, at a cost of USh3.5 billion (approx. US$1 million).

According to its financial statements for the year ending 30 June 2014, NSSF had UGX:2.65 trillion in government treasury bonds (with yields ranging from 10.25 to 14.35 percent), UGX:682.1 billion on deposit with commercial banks, UGX:251.3 billion in equity investments at fair value through profit or loss (EPL), UGX:250.2 billion in capital work-in-progress, UGX:193.7 billion in investment properties, UGX:143.2 billion in corporate bonds (with yields ranging from 11.03 to 17.00 percent), UGX:73.3 billion in equity securities held-for-trading by fund managers (HFT), and UGX:14.6 billion in cash and bank balances. Based on market value as of 30 June 2014, NSSF's largest investments in equity securities were as follows:

 Safaricom: UGX:89.7 billion (EPL)
 Umeme: UGX:88.1 billion (EPL)
 Stanbic Bank Uganda Limited: UGX:31.4 billion (EPL)
 DFCU Limited: UGX:18.0 billion (EPL)
 New Vision Group: UGX:9.0 billion (EPL)
 Tanzania Breweries Limited: UGX:7.04 billion (HFT)
 East African Breweries Limited: UGX:6.16 billion (HFT)
 Bank of Baroda Uganda Limited: UGX:5.74 billion (EPL)
 Diamond Trust Bank: UGX:5.63 billion (HFT)
 BAT Kenya Limited: UGX:5.57 billion (HFT)
 Centum Investments Limited: UGX:5.19 billion (EPL)
 Safaricom: UGX:4.90 billion (HFT)
 Kenya Commercial Bank: UGX:4.09 billion (HFT)
 Equity Bank Kenya Limited: UGX:3.97 billion (HFT)
 DFCU Bank: UGX:3.32 billion (HFT)
 CfC Stanbic Holdings: UGX:3.02 billion (HFT)
 Nation Media Group: UGX:2.91 billion (HFT)
 Equity Bank Group: UGX:2.78 billion (EPL)
 NIC Bank Limited: UGX:2.86 billion (HFT)
 Stanbic Bank Uganda Limited: UGX:2.84 billion (HFT)

Operations and economic performance
The NSSF is a defined contribution scheme and is financed largely by contributions from employers and employees. The total contribution is equal to 15 percent of an employee's gross salary, with the employer contributing 10 percent and the employee 5 percent. The NSSF pays five types of benefits:
 Age benefit - paid to a member who has reached the retirement age of 55
 Withdrawal benefit: Paid to a member who has reached the age of 50 and is out of regular employment for one year
 Invalidity benefit: Paid to a member who has become incapable of gainful employment
 Survivor's benefit: Paid to the dependent survivor of a member
 Emigration grant: Paid to a member who is leaving Uganda permanently.

The NSSF's total assets as of 30 June 2014, were valued at UGX:4.4 trillion.  In October 2017, The Independent, a Ugandan English language newspaper, estimated the NSSF total assets at USh7.9 trillion (approximately US$2.48 billion at that time), as of 30 June 2017. By June 2018, those assets had increased to USh9.98 trillion ($2.678 billion). As of 30 June 2020, NSSF Uganda managed a total asset portfolio of USh13.38 trillion ($3.627 billion). This was a 17 percent increase from UGX11.3 trillion ($3.064 billion), as of 30 June 2019. As of June 2021, NSSF Uganda controlled UGX:15.5 trillion (US$4.406 billion) in total assets.

Pension Towers

Beginning in the early 2000s, NSSFU has been developing an office complex known as Pension Towers, along Lumumba Avenue, on Nakasero Hill, one of the most prestigious neighborhoods in Kampala, Uganda's capital city. The complex consists of three interconnected towers; one central tower of twenty-five stories in height, flanked on either side by a ten-story tower. Roko Construction Company, a Ugandan construction company constructed the four basement floors between 2008 and 2012, but failed to qualify for further works on the project. Three Chinese firms are in a final bidding process to complete the construction, between 2012 and 2015. Construction costs for the complex are estimated at UGX:260 billion. Parking for over 500 vehicles will be provided in the development.

City House Jinja
Jinja City House is owned by the Uganda National Social Security Fund (NSSF), who developed the building, between 2015 and 2018. The building houses the NSSF offices in Jinja and the remaining space is rented out to qualified businesses and corporations. NSSF will occupy the remaining .

NSSF Mbarara Complex

Mbarara City House, is the second NSSF real estate investment outside the capital city of Kampala. It was developed at a cost of USh3.9 billion (approximately US$1.2 million), between 2017 and 2019.

Governance

Board of directors
Ugandan Minister of Finance Matia Kasaija appointed a new board of directors in September 2021, composed of the following members:

 Peter Kimbowa: Chairman 
 Aggrey David Kibenge
 Silver Mugisha 
 Patrick Ocailap
 Fred Bamwesigye
 Richard Byarugaba: Managing Director and CEO.
 Peninnah Tukamwesiga
 Sam Lyomoki
 Julius Bahemuka
 Hassan Lwabayi Mudiba

Management
The management of the NSSF consisted of the following individuals as of September 2021:

 Richard Byarugaba - Managing Director
 Patrick Ayota - Deputy Managing Director
 Agnes Tibayeyita Isharaza - Corporation Secretary (Effective 1 April 2019)
 Edward Ssenyonjo - Head of Risk
 Stevens Mwanje - Chief Finance Officer
 Barbara Teddy Arimi - Head of Marketing & Communications
 Milton Owor - Head of Human Resources & Administration 
 Gerald Paul Kasaato - Head of Investments
 Barigye Geoffrey - Head of Internal Audit
 Geoffrey Ssajjabi - Head of Business
 Elijah Kitaka - Head of Information Technology
 Jean Mutabazi - Head of Operations.

Branch network

As of June 2019, NSSF had a branch network of 19 branches in the central, eastern, northern, and western parts of Uganda, with six in Kampala, the capital.

 Head Office: Workers House, One Pilkington Road, Kampala
 Bugoloobi Branch: Bugoloobi
 Kireka Branch: Kireka
 Entebbe Branch: Entebbe
 Kawempe Branch: Kawempe
 Bakuli Branch: Bakuli
 Arua Branch: Arua
 Gulu Branch: Gulu
 Lira Branch: Lira
 Soroti Branch: Soroti
 Mbale Branch: Mbale
 Jinja Branch: City House Jinja, Jinja
 Lugazi Branch: Lugazi
 Masaka Branch: Masaka
 Masindi Branch: Masindi
 Hoima Branch: Hoima
 Fort Portal Branch: Fort Portal
 Mbarara Branch: NSSF Mbarara Complex, Mbarara
 Kabale Branch: Kabale

See also
Bank of Uganda
Economy of Uganda
Insurance Regulatory Authority of Uganda
Uganda Retirement Benefits Regulatory Authority
Uganda Revenue Authority
List of tallest buildings in Kampala

References

External links
Total Assets of UShs 6.25 Trillion As of June 2016 
 National Social Security Fund (Uganda) Homepage
 UShs170 Billion Set Aside To Boost Savers’ Interest - NSSF Board
NSSF holds 86% of all pension assets - report - As of December 2014

Welfare in Uganda
Finance in Uganda
Government-owned companies of Uganda
Kampala District